The first season of Too Hot to Handle was released on Netflix on April 17, 2020. A ninth episode reunion special was released on May 8.

Cast

Other appearances
Harry Jowsey was a contestant on the first season of Heartbreak Island in New Zealand. He later participated in the new reality show of MTV, Match Me If You Can. He also participated on Floor Is Lava with season 2 contestant Chase de Moor. Harry and Francesca Farago starred on Netflix’s Reality Games and were 2 of 4 players representing team "Too Hot to Handle". Francesca Farago appeared on the 27th series of The Only Way Is Essex. She also appeared on the Netflix dating reality Love Is Blind season one special episodes ("After The Altar") as one contestant's new dating partner.

Lydia Clyma was featured on Magaluf Weekender and Sex Clinic. Sharron Townsend appeared on MTV's Undressed in 2017, and he has had minor appearances in Love & Hip Hop and Creed II. Matthew Smith was a contestant on the twenty-first season of America's Next Top Model. Madison Wyborny starred on Neighbors & Friends.

Chloe Veitch later went on to appear on season two of The Circle US in 2021. Kelz Dyke competed on The Challenge: Spies, Lies & Allies. David Birtwistle appeared on Channel 4 dating show The Love Trap in 2021. Kori Sampson and Lydia Clyma each appeared on an episode of series 2 of Celeb Ex In The City. Chloe Veitch and Nicole O'Brien both took part in Celebrity Ghost Trip as a pair. In 2022 Chloe competed on Celebrity Hunted. She then went on to appear on an episode of Eating With My Ex with Kori. Kori starred on series 2 of Celebrity Ex On The Beach.

Bryce and Nicole appeared on the fifth season of MTV's Ex on the Beach.

Francesca and Chloe appeared on the first season of the spin-off series Perfect Match

Episodes

After filming

References

2020 American television seasons